Streptomyces roseiscleroticus is a bacterium species from the genus of Streptomyces which has been isolated from soil from the Gujarat State in India. Streptomyces roseiscleroticus produces sultriecin.

Further reading

See also 
 List of Streptomyces species

References

External links
Type strain of Streptomyces roseiscleroticus at BacDive -  the Bacterial Diversity Metadatabase

roseiscleroticus
Bacteria described in 1970